Iolaus pollux, the Pollux sapphire, is a butterfly in the family Lycaenidae. It is found in Ivory Coast, Nigeria, Cameroon, Gabon, the Republic of the Congo, the Democratic Republic of the Congo, Uganda, Kenya and Zambia. The habitat consists of forests.

The larvae feed on Agelanthus krausei.

Subspecies
Iolaus pollux pollux (Nigeria: south and the Cross River loop, Cameroon, Gabon, Congo, Democratic Republic of the Congo)
Iolaus pollux albocaerulea (Riley, 1929) (Uganda, western Kenya, northern Zambia, Democratic Republic of the Congo: Sankuru, Lualaba and Uele)
Iolaus pollux oberthueri (Riley, 1929) (Ivory Coast)

References

Butterflies described in 1895
Iolaus (butterfly)
Butterflies of Africa